Notchless protein homolog 1 is a protein that in humans is encoded by the NLE1 gene.

References

Further reading